Li Xiaohui (born 12 February 1956) is a retired Chinese discus thrower.

International competitions

References

External links

1956 births
Living people
Chinese female discus throwers
Asian Games medalists in athletics (track and field)
Athletes (track and field) at the 1978 Asian Games
Athletes (track and field) at the 1982 Asian Games
Athletes (track and field) at the 1986 Asian Games
World Athletics Championships athletes for China
Asian Games gold medalists for China
Asian Games silver medalists for China
Medalists at the 1978 Asian Games
Medalists at the 1982 Asian Games
Medalists at the 1986 Asian Games
20th-century Chinese women